Digonopyla is a monotypic genus of land planarians in the tribe Rhynchodemini. It contains a single species, Digonopyla harmeri.

Description 
Digonopyla harmeri is characterized by the presence of numerous pharynges and mouths. The copulatory apparatus has a wall of tissue separating the male and female atria that results in independent male and female openings, an unusual condition in land planarians.

References 

Geoplanidae
Rhabditophora genera